The costate mountain snail, scientific name Oreohelix idahoensis is a species of air-breathing land snail, a terrestrial pulmonate gastropod mollusk in the family Oreohelicidae. This species is endemic to the United States.

References

Endemic fauna of the United States
Oreohelicidae
Gastropods described in 1890